Avedisian is an Armenian surname. Notable people with the surname include:

 Chuck Avedisian (1917-1983), professional football player
 Edward Avedisian (1936–2007), American painter
 Margaux Avedisian, American entrepreneur and comedian
 Scott Avedisian (born 1965), American politician

See also
 Avetisyan

Armenian-language surnames